Sandhayak (2021) (Hindi: संधायक lit. coordinator) is the lead ship of her class. A hydrographic survey ship being built by GRSE for the Indian Navy. It was launched on 5 December 2021. It is expected to be commissioned by October 2022.

Design 
The ships have a complement of 231 and are equipped with hydrographic sensor equipment and a hangar which can accommodate one advanced light helicopter. In the secondary role, the ships can be fitted with a CRN 91 naval gun. In addition, the vessels will follow MARPOL (marine pollution) Standards of the International Maritime Organisation and will be built per Classification Society Rules and Naval Ship Regulations.

The primary role of the vessels would be to conduct coastal and deep-water hydro-graphic survey of ports, navigational channels, Economic Exclusive Zones and collection of oceanographic data for defence. Their secondary role would be to perform search & rescue, ocean research and function as hospital ships for casualties.

Construction 
The keel of the ship was laid on 8 November 2019 and launched on 5 December 2021. She is the lead  class of her class.

See also
GRSE-class survey vessel - class of survey ship
INS Sandhayak (J18) -predecessor ship with the same name

References

Ships built in India